Naqneh (also known as Naghuna and Naqon) is a city in the Central District of Borujen County, Chaharmahal and Bakhtiari province, Iran. At the 2006 census, its population was 8,086 in 1,994 households, when it was a village. The following census in 2011 counted 9,603 people in 2,649 households, by which time the village had been elevated to the status of a city. The latest census in 2016 showed a population of 9,923 people in 2,815 households. The city is populated by Persians and Qashqais with a small Luri minority.

Language 
The linguistic composition of the city:

References 

Borujen County

Cities in Chaharmahal and Bakhtiari Province

Populated places in Chaharmahal and Bakhtiari Province

Populated places in Borujen County